Nikolay Ivanovich Perevozchikov (born 1927) was a Soviet sprint canoer who competed in the early 1950s. Together with Valentin Orischenko he finished fourth in the C-2 10000 m event at the 1952 Summer Olympics in Helsinki.

References

External links
  

1927 births
Possibly living people
Canoeists at the 1952 Summer Olympics
Olympic canoeists of the Soviet Union
Soviet male canoeists